Rieti (Fredrik Wilhelm) Itkonen (5 March 1889, Lappeenranta - 1 July 1951) was a Finnish lawyer, journalist and politician. He was a member of the Social Democratic Party of Finland. He served as Minister of the Interior in Väinö Tanner's cabinet (13 December 1926 - 12 April 1927) and as a Member of Parliament (1 April 1919 - 31 July 1929).

References

1889 births
1951 deaths
People from Lappeenranta
People from Viipuri Province (Grand Duchy of Finland)
Social Democratic Party of Finland politicians
Ministers of the Interior of Finland
Members of the Parliament of Finland (1919–22)
Members of the Parliament of Finland (1922–24)
Members of the Parliament of Finland (1924–27)
Members of the Parliament of Finland (1927–29)
University of Helsinki alumni